The Attorney General of Kentucky is an office created by the Kentucky Constitution. (Ky.Const. § 91). Under Kentucky law, they serve several roles, including the state's chief prosecutor (KRS 15.700), the state's chief law enforcement officer (KRS 15.700), and the state's chief law officer (KRS 15.020). As the chief prosecutor, the Attorney General is the Chairman of the Kentucky Prosecutors Advisory Council, which supervises the prosecutors of Kentucky (KRS 15.700, KRS 15.705). As chief law officer, they write opinions to advise government officials and agencies concerning the law. (KRS 15.020). The Attorney General holds an ex officio seat on various Kentucky state boards and agencies.

The Attorney General of Kentucky is elected for a four-year term in the same year other statewide officers are elected, rather than being appointed as in some states such as Alaska. A 1992 amendment to the Kentucky Constitution permits the Attorney General of Kentucky to serve two consecutive terms. (Ky.Const. § 93). The Attorney General appoints a deputy and various Assistants to the Attorney General, who have the power to act on his behalf. (KRS 15.100(1)).

The Attorney General of Kentucky is currently Republican Daniel Cameron. Cameron's predecessor, Democrat Andy Beshear, resigned from the post on December 10, 2019 to be sworn in as Governor of Kentucky. Beshear appointed Cameron to serve out the remainder of his unexpired term on December 17, 2019. Cameron, who is the first African American ever to hold the position and the first Republican to hold the office since 1948, was elected to a full term of office in November 2019 and was sworn in for that term on January 6, 2020.

List of attorneys general of Kentucky

References

External links
 Kentucky Attorney General official website
 Kentucky Attorney General Daniel Cameron profile at National Association of Attorneys General

The Kentucky Attorney General's Office is divided into the following divisions:
 Administrative Hearings Division
 Child Support Enforcement Commission (CSEC)
 Kentucky Department of Criminal Investigation (DCI)
 Medicaid Fraud Division
 Office of Civil and Environmental Law
 Office of Consumer Protection
 Office of Criminal Appeals
 Office of Rate Intervention
 Prosecutors Advisory Council
 Special Prosecutions Division
 Uninsured Employers' Fund
 Office for Victims Advocacy

Kentucky state courts